Colin Noon (born 24 October 1975 in Bridgend) is a rugby union footballer for Leeds Tykes. His usual position is at prop.

External links
Leeds profile 

1975 births
Living people
Leeds Tykes players
Rugby union players from Bridgend
Welsh rugby union players
Rugby union props